The 2014–15 Korisliiga was the 75th season of the highest professional basketball tier in Finland. The league champion qualified for the 2015–16 Eurocup regular season. Kataja won its first title in franchise history.

Teams
Eleven teams participated in the Korisliiga this season. Lappeenrannan NMKY left the league because of its poor economic situation.

Budgets

Regular season

Rounds 1-20

Rounds 21-40

Playoffs

Awards

References

Korisliiga seasons
Finnish
Koris